CRRC Dalian Co., Ltd., often abbreviated as DLoco, is a company located in Dalian, Liaoning Province, China, producing railway locomotives, multiple units and diesel engines.

The factory was established in 1899 during the period of construction of the Chinese Eastern Railway, as the Shahekou works, and was under Japanese control from 1905, and later part of the Manchukuo state. After the end of the Second World War the railway was under joint Chinese and Russian control until the 1950s when the Chinese Eastern Railroad and the city of Dalian were transferred to sole Chinese control. The factory was state owned, and controlled by the Ministry of Railways until 2001 when LORIC (China National Railway Locomotive & Rolling Stock Industry Corporation) was split into two groups (as part of CNR Group); it then became one of the constituent companies of listed company China CNR, and after June 1, 2015, CRRC, an unification of two listed companies that derived from 2001 split.

History

1899–1952

The locomotive factory in Dalian was founded in 1899, contemporary with the construction of the southern branch of the Chinese Eastern Railway during the lease of the Liaodong Peninsula from China to the Russian Empire, and to the development of Dalian as a port and town.

In 1905, the "Shahekou Plant" came under Japanese control as a result of the Treaty of Portsmouth, and in 1906 the railway from Dalian to Changchun became part of the Japanese controlled South Manchurian Railway.

In 1934 the factory together with Kawasaki Heavy Industries, manufactured the Asia Express high speed steam train for the South Manchuria Railway.

In 1945 at the end of the Second World War the city came under Soviet Russian control. The Changchun Railway was jointly operated by China and Russia until 1952, when control was passed entirely to the Chinese government. Soviet Russian occupation ended in 1955.

1952–2000
In 1956 the company manufactured the China Railways HP prototype 2-10-2 steam locomotive. and in 1957, the first China Railways JS class 2-8-2 locomotive, of which 1916 were built at different plants. as well as other steam locomotives.

Diesel locomotives were developed and produced at the plant, a prototype diesel electric type "JuLong" was produced in 1958 based on the Russian ТЭ10 locomotive and Fairbanks-Morse FM38D opposed piston engine, which led to the DF class diesel electric locomotives entered production in 1964.

The change from steam to diesel production began in 1965, and in 1969, the first of the China Railways DF4 class of locomotives was produced. The DF4 series of locomotive type became the main mainline diesel locomotive type in China, and developments were produced in the following decades; including the DF4B in 1984, the DF4D in 1996.

In the 1980s the company began a decade long research partnership with Ricardo plc into increasing the power output and efficiency of its DL240 diesel engine products. In 1997 it began working with Southwest Research Institute (USA) on the design of a new locomotive diesel engine.

The company first exported a mainline diesel locomotive in 1993 (to Myanmar), by the  middle of the first decade of the 21st century the company had exported over 200 diesel locomotives.

By 2000 the company was producing half of the China's internal supply of diesel locomotives, and manufactured 80% of the countries diesel locomotive exports.

2000–present
Dalian locomotive works' parent company, state-owned China National Railway Locomotive & Rolling Stock Industry Corporation (LORIC), was split into the northern and southern groups in 2002; the locomotive works part of China Northern Locomotive & Rolling Stock Industry (Group) Corporation along with other rail vehicle manufacturers in China. The locomotive works was also incorporated as a limited company in 2003, known as CNR Group Dalian Locomotive & Rolling Stock or just CNR Dalian.

In the first decade of the 21st century the plant began producing two new mainline locomotive product types; the China Railways HXD3 electric locomotives in association with Toshiba, a joint venture with Toshiba was formed in 2002 to manufacture electric equipment for rolling stock. Also in the 2000s the diesel electric locomotives China Railways HXN3 were produced at Dalian in association with GM EMD.

As part of the initial public offering, the stake of CRN Dalian was transferred to an intermediate holding company China CNR in 2008.

In 2009 the company obtained its first export order to supply locomotives to a western country, an order for 20 New Zealand DL class locomotives.

In 2009 the groundbreaking ceremony took place for a new plant in the Lüshun economic development zone (Lushunkou District); the new facility was developed in conjunction with the municipal council of Dalian city. The facility, on a  site, is designed to have a production of around 1000 locomotives, 1000 rail vehicles and 1000 diesel engines per year. The plant officially opened in August 2011, the first vehicles on the production line were metro passenger units for Line 2, Tianjin Metro.

In 2015, they delivered the prototype of the 8MLB LRV in Manila as part of the Manila Metro Rail Transit Line 3 capacity expansion. Currently there are no any Dalian Trainsets were running in the line due to the controversies surrounding it including the incompatibility with the line's signaling system and tare weight and the line rehabilitation contract restrictions made with the Department of Transportation (DOTr) and Sumitomo Corporation-Mitsubishi Heavy Industries-TES Philippines (TESP).

One of the company's latest export orders came in January 2015 from the Lagos Metropolitan Area Transport Authority for 15 metro trains for the Lagos Rail Mass Transit system in Nigeria, with an option for 14 more. This order came about following a failed acquisition of old H-series carriages retired from the Toronto Subway. In the same year an order was placed for 14 eight car trains for Line 1 of the Kolkata Metro.

Products and services
The company's primary products are railway rolling stock and related parts; it has a production capacity of ~600 locomotives and 300 metro rail vehicles per year.
 CKD8
 8MLB LRV

Sister companies and organizations 
Sharing the same registered address in the Shahekou District, CRRC Dalian Dali Railway Transportation Equipment Co., Ltd. was found in 2007. The company was not listed and remained in the unlisted portion of CRRC Group.

Another company, "Daqi company" or "Dalian Qiqihar Railway Rolling Stock Railway Transportation Equipment Co., Ltd." by CRRC Qiqihar Railway Rolling Stock in 2007. The company was based in Lüshun Economic Development Zone of Lüshunkou District. It was part of CRRC (via CRRC Qiqihar Railway Rolling Stock), the listed portion of CRRC Group.

Research, development and education

In 1956, Dalian Locomotive and Rolling Stock Manufacturing School was established nearby on Huanghe Road, which became the Dalian Railway Institute in 1958, and in 2004 Dalian Jiaotong University.

Also located in Dalian,  was founded in 1922 by South Manchuria Railway Company as a closely associated institute of the railway and the locomotive works; the organisation was incorporated as a company and as a subsidiary of China CNR in 2007.

It was incorporated as a company in 2013.

Gallery

See also
 Ministry of Railways (China)
 CNR Group
 CNR Corporation
 CRRC
 :Category:CRRC Dalian locomotives

Notes

References

External links

 Dalian Locomotive factory (entrance)
  

Rail transport in Liaoning
CRRC Group
Ministry of Railways of China
Manufacturing companies based in Dalian
Vehicle manufacturing companies established in 1899
Vehicle manufacturing companies established in 2003
Chinese companies established in 2003
Chinese brands
Diesel engine manufacturers
Locomotive engine manufacturers
Engine manufacturers of China
Chinese companies established in 1899